Igor Aleksandrovich Ponomaryov (born 27 June 1996) is a Russian footballer.

Club career
He made his debut in the Russian Professional Football League for FC Kuban-2 Krasnodar on 28 July 2016 in a game against FC Spartak Vladikavkaz.

He made his debut for the main squad of FC Kuban Krasnodar on 24 August 2016 in a Russian Cup game against FC Energomash Belgorod.

He made his Russian Football National League debut for Kuban on 19 March 2017 in a game against FC Mordovia Saransk.

References

External links
 Profile by Russian Professional Football League
 Profile by Russian Football National League

1996 births
Living people
Russian footballers
Association football defenders
FC Kuban Krasnodar players
FC Urozhay Krasnodar players
FC Armavir players
FC SKA Rostov-on-Don players
Russian First League players
Russian Second League players
Latvian Higher League players
Russian expatriate footballers
Expatriate footballers in Latvia